The Nysa family (adj. Nysian; FIN: 405) is part of the Nysa–Polana complex, the largest cluster of asteroid families in the asteroid belt. It is located in the inner region of the asteroid belt, orbiting the Sun between 2.41 and 2.5 AU. Asteroids in this complex have eccentricities between 0.12 and 0.21 and inclinations of 1.4 to 4.3. The family derives its name from its most massive member, 44 Nysa. It has also been known as the Hertha family (adj. Herthian) named after 135 Hertha.

Subdivision 

Asteroids in this complex are typically divided into the stony Nysa and carbonaceous Polana subgroups, two mineralogically different families:
 The much brighter S-type Nysian subgroup (i.e. the Nysa family, in the narrower sense) includes 44 Nysa and 135 Hertha.
 In the low-albedo subgroup of the complex lies the Polana family (adj Polanian), a family of dark F-type asteroids named after 142 Polana, the largest asteroid in this section. More recently an additional family, the Eulalia family has also been identified inside this subgroup.

Nysian asteroids

See also 
 101955 Bennu, probably part of the Polana family, visited by the OSIRIS-REx spacecraft in 2018

References